Shockman (known in Japan as  is a 1991 video game developed by Winds and released exclusively for the TurboGrafx-16. It was released in the United States in 1992, making it the only game in the Kaizou Choujin Shubibinman series to be released outside Japan.

Plot
Shockman takes about two years after the original Kaizou Choujin Shubibinman. Arnold (Tasuke (太助) in the Japanese version) is no longer a student and works as a cook in a local restaurant. Sonya (Kyapiko (キャピ子)) remains a student. Since the fall of the Dark Skull, Doc has constantly suspected that another invasion was coming sending Arnold and Sonya on searches for the new invaders although never finding anything. However, one day, after Doc is kidnapped, Arnold and Sonya find out that an alien empire led by Ryo is planning to take over the world. Also, two other villains have appeared with similar powers to Arnold and Sonya. They are dark Shubibinman (シュビビンマン) named Jeeta (ベータ Bēta) and Mue (ミュー Myū). Arnold and Sonya must now rescue Doc, stop Ryo from taking over the world, and avoid being killed by Jeeta and Mue.

Gameplay
Shockman plays very differently from the previous title. Swordplay has been eliminated and is replaced by a ranged weapon much like Mega Man's Mega Buster. The world map, upgrades, and hostages have also been removed from the game. There are also now two side-scrolling shooter stages. Additionally, jump control has been altered.

Release 
The game was released in Japan on April 27, 1991. The third game in the series, a 1992 release for the TurboGrafx-CD, was slated for release in North America in August 1993 under the tentative title Shockman 2, with Turbo Technologies, Inc. as the publisher and Working Designs handling the translation. However, this release was later cancelled. Shockman would be re-released on the Wii Virtual Console worldwide throughout 2007.  It was released in the 2010s for the Wii U Virtual Console.

It received a release for the iPhone in 2011, through an app called "PC Engine Gamebox", which included several other PC engine titles.

Reception 
On release, the Japanese gaming magazine Famitsu gave it a score of 21 out of 40.

Nintendo Life gave it a 6 out of 10.

References

1991 video games
Hudson Soft games
Masaya Games games
Multiplayer and single-player video games
Platform games
TurboGrafx-16 games
Video games developed in Japan
Video games featuring female protagonists
Virtual Console games for Wii U
Virtual Console games